The Sonomia Terrane is a geologic crustal block known as a "terrane" whose remnants today lie in northwest Nevada.  The terrane acquired its name from the Sonoma Range in that region.  The Sonomia Terrane is associated with the Golconda Thrust, a structure named for its proximity to the town of Golconda, Nevada. The Sonoma orogeny was caused by the accretion of the Sonomia microcontinent onto western North America during the mid-Triassic.

References

Geology of Nevada
Terranes